In the Philippines, a number of stories have been published on the social website Wattpad and later adapted for film or television.

The first film of this type to be released was Viva Films' Diary ng Panget.  The story had been popular and the film was a box-office success.  This was followed by Star Cinema's She's Dating the Gangster which also became a major hit upon release.

Highest-grossing films

 Ex with Benefits earned with an estimated amount of ₱83,340,000 domestically, but due to inflation and the increase of currency exchange and the demand of movie tickets, the film earned an estimated amount of ₱100,670,00 domestically as of (2018 ₱). Same with Talk Back and You're Dead that earned ₱76,900,000 in the box-office but in 2018, the film garnered ₱96,600,000 domestically.

Films and Television series

Shelve films

References

Lists of Philippine films